Pont Paith is a hamlet in the  community of Llanfarian, Ceredigion, Wales, 73 miles (117.5 km) from Cardiff and 177.9 miles (286.2 km) from London. Pont Paith is represented in the Senedd by Elin Jones (Plaid Cymru) and is part of the Ceredigion constituency in the House of Commons.

References

See also
List of localities in Wales by population 

Villages in Ceredigion